Ashtown may refer to:

 Ashtown, Dublin, a suburb of Dublin, Ireland
Ashtown, Ghana, a suburb of Kumasi, Ghana
 Ashtown Castle, a fortified house in the Phoenix Park in Dublin
 Ashtown railway station, a nearby station
 Ashtown Burials, a book series by N. D. Wilson
 Baron Ashtown, a title in the Irish peerage.